Mohamed Naguib Abdullah Shaaban Wafi known as Mohamed Naguib Abdullah (born June 26, 1974, in Denmark) is an Egyptian writer and physician. He has written various short stories, from which he translated his collection of short stories, Before the Death of a King, into Italian and French. In the field of medicine, he obtained his master's and doctorate degrees (in 2007) in the field of internal medicine from the Faculty of Medicine, Cairo University and works as a professor of internal diseases at the Faculty of Medicine, Cairo University.

Bibliography

Novels 
 , 2005, 9776148069
 , 2007.
 ,2008.
 ,2012.
 ,2014.
 ,2014.
 ,2014..
 ,2016,.
 ,2018,.

Memberships 
 Member of the Egyptian Writers Union
 Member of the story club in the hunting club
 Member of the literary activity of the 6th of October Club
 Member of the Egyptian Society for the Study of Liver and Digestive Diseases (as a physician)
 Member of the European Society of Gastrointestinal Endoscopy (as a physician)
 Member of the Arab Society for the Study of Diabetes and Metabolism (as a physician)

See also 

 Abdelnasser Gohary

References 

Egyptian writers
Cairo University alumni
Academic staff of Cairo University
1974 births
Living people